Battambang Royal railway station is a railway station in Battambang, the capital city of Battambang province in northwestern Cambodia. It was opened in 1953 and is operated by Royal Railways of Cambodia (Chemins de Fer Royaux du Cambodge).

Location 
The station and its rail tracks are at the Phnom Penh–Poipet(–Bangkok) line at the west side of the town Battambang in Battambang province.

Buildings 

The station building is well preserved and was repainted after taking the track out. The clock above the entrance stands still at 8:02 o'clock since an unknown day.

As of January 2018 the rail tracks are being replaced. Beyond them, there are ruined remains of warehouses, signal boxes and rolling stock. Although dilapidated, some of them are use for living, storage or business.

Railway line 

It was completed by the Thais, after the French had done the groundbreaking work during World War II. Battambang was occupied by Thailand during the war.

The railway was heavily attacked by artillery during the Cambodian Civil War, and the Khmer Rouge sabotaged the track at several locations. Limited rail traffic was provided in the 1980s between Battambang and Phnom Penh. The ride covering the distance of less than  lasted 14 hours. However, a road trip lasted 2–3 days and was more demanding and dangerous. Railway services were completely cancelled in 2009 due to poor track conditions, but the line has been reopened in July 2018. Trains to the Thai border now operate every second day, and a service from Phnom Penh to Bangkok is planned.

List of stations 
 Phnom Penh 
 Pursat
 Moung Ruessei
 Battambang
 Sisophon
 Poipet

Trivia 

References

External links

Battambang District
Railway stations in Cambodia
Railway stations opened in 1953